Sajid Ghafoor (Urdu: ساجد غفور) is a musician who, along with Zeeshan Parwez, forms the duo Sajid & Zeeshan. The duo, from the city of Peshawar, sing the majority of their songs in English.

Biography
Sajid was born and raised in Peshawar. He received his primary education in Peshawar and did his Fsc. from the Pakistani Air Force Degree College Peshawar, his BA from Islamia College University Peshawar, his LLB from Peshawar University, his LL.M from Hull University UK, and a diploma in International Environmental law from Oslo University, Norway. He is currently lecturing at the Law College, Peshawar University. Sajid created an underground music scene in Peshawar in the mid-nineties by establishing a band called "Still" with his younger brother, Sarmad Ghafoor. Sajid recorded a number of songs for the band, but never released them commercially. "One Light Year At Snail Speed", released in 2006, was his first album with Zeeshan. Their song King of Self has won various awards.

Sarmad  plays guitar for Atif Aslam and travels with him for tour.

References

External links
 Sajid & Zeeshan

Year of birth missing (living people)
Living people
Pakistani male singers
University of Peshawar alumni
People from Peshawar
Pashtun people